Novato Downtown station is a train station in Novato, California. It opened as an infill station for the Sonoma–Marin Area Rail Transit (SMART) service in December 2019.

History

The original Northwestern Pacific Railroad (NWP) depot was built out of redwood on the site in 1879; that building was moved nearby and a new one constructed in 1903. The second station was destroyed in a fire in 1916, and the current station building was built as its replacement. Increased automobile ownership and highway construction led to a decline of rail travel in Marin County, thus leading to disuse of the facility as a passenger terminal sometime after 1958.

Not part of the design for the original ten stations from SMART's Initial Opening Segment, funding and construction of the station was undertaken by the City of Novato. Station plans were finalized in 2016 and the platform was built at a cost of $2.4 million by the time trains began operation. The Metropolitan Transportation Commission provided $1.5 million toward finishing the station, leaving $1.6 million to be financed via an additional source or via the city's Hamilton Trust.

By May 2018, the Phase 2 cost of construction had increased to $5.2 million. The SMART Board approved the station plan in July 2018. Station equipment was expected to be installed in the summer, and testing done in the fall. By September 2019, the total cost was over $7 million.

Original plans called for the station to only have limited service due to its proximity to the Novato San Marin station. However, the SMART Board voted in June 2019 to instate regular, full-time service to the station; testing commenced on November 8, 2019. The station opened on December 14, 2019, for weekend and holiday service; weekday service began on January 1, 2020.

References

External links

Novato Downtown | SMART
Downtown SMART Station | City of Novato

Railway stations in the United States opened in 2019
Sonoma-Marin Area Rail Transit stations in Marin County
Railway stations in the United States opened in 1879
Railway stations closed in 1958
1879 establishments in California
Novato, California
2019 establishments in California
Former Northwestern Pacific Railroad stations